Daniel Gil Adi competed for Israel in swimming, and men's standing volleyball at the 1976 Summer Paralympics, and the 2000 Summer Paralympics, winning four gold medal in 1976.

At the 1976 Summer Paralympics he also competed in para athletics, winning a gold medal in the men's 100 m E event, and para swimming, winning gold medals in the men's 50 m freestyle E and 50 m breaststroke E events.

See also 
 Israel at the 1976 Summer Paralympics
 Israel at the 2000 Summer Paralympics

References 

Living people
Year of birth missing (living people)
Place of birth missing (living people)
Israeli male sprinters
Israeli male swimmers
Israeli men's volleyball players
Paralympic athletes of Israel
Paralympic swimmers of Israel
Paralympic volleyball players of Israel
Paralympic gold medalists for Israel
Paralympic medalists in athletics (track and field)
Paralympic medalists in swimming
Paralympic medalists in volleyball
Athletes (track and field) at the 1976 Summer Paralympics
Swimmers at the 1976 Summer Paralympics
Volleyball players at the 1976 Summer Paralympics
Volleyball players at the 2000 Summer Paralympics
Medalists at the 1976 Summer Paralympics
Paralympic sprinters
Sprinters with limb difference